Cardinal Dubois may refer to:
Guillaume Dubois (1656–1723), Archbishop of Cambrai and French statesman
Louis-Ernest Dubois (1856–1929), Archbishop of Paris